JGS may refer to:

 Jesse H. Jones Graduate School of Business, part of Rice University in Houston, Texas, United States
 Jinggangshan Airport, in Jiangxi province, China
 Joan Stark, American artist
 Joint General Staff, the defunct high command of the Republic of Vietnam Military Forces
 Journal of the Geological Society
 Jungshahi railway station, in Sindh, Pakistan